The Sydenham River is a river in Grey County in southern Ontario. The river flows north from a source near Williamsford, drops over the Niagara Escarpment at Inglis Falls and empties into Owen Sound harbour on Georgian Bay. It was named after Lord Sydenham, governor of Canada from 1839 to 1841.

The river is obstructed by Mill Dam. At this dam is a fish ladder that allows Chinook Salmon and Rainbow Trout to complete their spawning migrations in this river.

The Spey River is a tributary of this river.

See also  
List of rivers of Ontario

References

External links
Grey Sauble Conservation Authority

Rivers of Grey County
Tributaries of Georgian Bay